Sonsonate is a city and municipality of El Salvador. Pop. (2007), about 71,541.

Economy

Historically, the area was a producer of cotton. Most of the cotton produced, as of 1850, was retained for local use. Today, tobacco farming, cattle ranching and tourism (volcanos, coral reef) are important industries.

Notes

References

External links

Municipalities of the Sonsonate Department